Maurice Nathan Saatchi, Baron Saatchi (born 21 June 1946) is a British-Iraqi businessman, and with his brother, Charles, co-founder of the advertising agencies Saatchi & Saatchi and M&C Saatchi.

Early life 
Maurice Saatchi is the third of four sons born to Nathan Saatchi and Daisy Ezer, a wealthy Iraqi Sephardi Jewish family in Baghdad, Iraq. Maurice's brothers are David (born 1937), Charles Nathan (born 1943) and Philip (born 1953). Nathan was a successful textile merchant, and in 1947 he pre-empted a flight that tens of thousands of Iraqi Jews would soon make to avoid persecution and relocated his family to Finchley in London. Nathan purchased two textile mills in north London and after a time re-built a thriving business. Eventually the family would settle into a house with eight bedrooms on Hampstead Lane in Highgate.

Saatchi attended Tollington Grammar School and graduated from the London School of Economics with a first class honours degree in Sociology in 1967. His first job was at Haymarket Publications where Maurice would form valuable relationships with Michael Heseltine, the group managing director and with staff at the Haymarket's leading trade weekly for the ad industry Campaign. He spent three years at Haymarket as creative director before leaving to join his brother Charles' fledgling ad agency.

Career

Saatchi and Saatchi
In 1970, Saatchi, with his brother, formed the advertising agency Saatchi & Saatchi. They are credited with a number of successful advertising campaigns, most notably the "Labour isn't working" posters on behalf of the Conservative Party for the 1979 British general election and advertisements for the cigarette brand Silk Cut. Maurice Saatchi served as chairman of the firm which by 1986 – following its acquisition of advertising firm Ted Bates – had grown to be the largest ad agency in the world, with over 600 offices.

M&C Saatchi
At the turn of 1995, in the fallout from a shareholder revolt, Saatchi and his brother left the agency, and together founded the rival M&C Saatchi agency, taking with them many of their management and creative staff, as well as a number of clients – including British Airways. The new company has also been described as a success.

In mid 2019 M&C Saatchi PLC - a public company listed on the AIM exchange - reported to the City some accounting irregularities which would cause the company to take a charge lowering its 2018 and 2019 results. By the time the matter was finalised in December 2019 following a PricewaterhouseCoopers review, the accounting issues were quantified at £11.6M. Over the course of 2019 the company's share price took a significant tumble from near £4 down to 79p. Then in a shock announcement to the City on 10 December Saatchi resigned as an executive director along with all three of the independent non-executive directors – Sir Michael Peat, Baron Dobbs and Lorna Tilbian. It was reported that the departing directors disagreed over whether David Kershaw, one of Saatchi's co-founders of the company should stay as CEO following the accounting scandal.

Political career
Maurice Saatchi was created a life peer as Baron Saatchi (or, Lord Saatchi), of Staplefield in the County of West Sussex on 4 October 1996. He sits in the House of Lords as a Conservative. Under the leadership of Iain Duncan Smith, Saatchi served as shadow Treasury spokesman in the Lords, forming a close relationship with Michael Howard, who was Shadow Chancellor of the Exchequer. Saatchi argued for the simplification of the tax system and that the poorest eight million people in the United Kingdom should not pay income tax. In June 2014, he suggested that small businesses should pay no corporate tax and that investors in said small businesses should pay no capital gains tax in order to "challenge cartel capitalism."

After Howard became leader of the Conservatives in November 2003, Saatchi was appointed joint chairman of the party with Liam Fox. He had responsibility for running the party campaign for the 2005 general election, after which he stepped down. He published his reflections on the election campaign in a Centre for Policy Studies pamphlet If this is Conservatism, I am a Conservative in a chapter entitled How I Lost the Election. Among his failings listed in the document, Saatchi highlighted the following:

 I DID NOT convince the Party that if you don't stand for something, you'll fall for anything.
 I DID NOT dispel the illusion of research, which said that, as immigration was the number one issue in deciding how people vote, it should be the number one topic.
 I DID NOT prevent economics, the Conservatives' former ace of trumps, becoming a 'second order issue.'''
 I DID NOT avoid the underestimation of public intelligence, as in the policy description 'Lower Taxes' when in fact taxes would be higher.He recommended that future Conservative leaders establish a "moral purpose" as an ideology and future direction for the Party.

Following the death of his wife Josephine Hart to ovarian cancer, Maurice Saatchi has campaigned for a change to the UK law which, he believes, holds doctors back from using innovative treatments because they fear litigation. His Medical Innovation Bill was formally introduced in 2013 and was co-adopted by the government in its passage through parliament. The bill has enjoyed some popular support and favourable press coverage, but has drawn a critical response from some medical and legal bodies, patient groups and charities.

Other roles
He was chairman of the Finsbury Food Group plc, and is a governor of the London School of Economics. Saatchi is a trustee of the Museum of Garden History, and also a director of the Centre for Policy Studies. He was also a trustee of the Victoria and Albert Museum from 1988 to 1996.

Accolades and philanthropy
He is a previous recipient of St. George's Society of New York's Medal of Honour, an award established in 1996 which recognizes those who have rendered exemplary service to British interests and/or the international community at large.

He and his brother founded the Saatchi Shul, an independent Orthodox Jewish synagogue in Maida Vale, London, England, in 1998.

 Personal life 
Saatchi's first wife was Gillian Osband, a children's book editor and writer whom he had known since childhood and whom he married in 1972. They divorced in 1984 and that same year he married the novelist Josephine Hart (1942–2011), whom he first met when they worked together at Haymarket Publications in 1967. She died on 2 June 2011.

His country property is a mock Tudor castle called Old Hall in Staplefield, West Sussex, built in 1842. There are sixty acres of parkland and ten acres of flowers, trees and lakes. Maurice Saatchi has a fondness for gardening, laid out the garden on the estate and built a conservatory to house semi-tropical plants. The property was the subject of a display article in Architectural Digest in January 1995.

Maurice Saatchi and his brother Charles were listed at number 366 in the Sunday Times Rich List 2008, with an estimated wealth of £220m in advertising and art. In the Sunday Times Rich List 2009 they were listed at number 438.

Arms

 Bibliography 
 Maurice Saatchi Do Not Resuscitate: The Life and Afterlife of Maurice Saatchi
 Maurice Saatchi If this is Conservatism, I am a Conservative from the Centre for Policy Studies

 References 

General
 

 External links 
Maurice Saatchi profile

Business profile at Bloomberg Businessweek''
M&C Saatchi Website
M&C Saatchi Mobile Marketing Website
 The Guardian Media Top 100 2001 number 44; 2002 number 47

1946 births
Alumni of the London School of Economics
British advertising executives
British Sephardi Jews
British people of Iraqi-Jewish descent
Chairmen of the Conservative Party (UK)
Conservative Party (UK) life peers
Iraqi emigrants to the United Kingdom
Iraqi Jews
Living people
People from Baghdad
British politicians of Iraqi descent
Maurice
Jewish British politicians
Life peers created by Elizabeth II